Dimethyl methylphosphonate is an organophosphorus compound with the chemical formula CH3PO(OCH3)2. It is a colourless liquid, which is primarily used as a flame retardant.

Synthesis
Dimethyl methylphosphonate can be prepared from trimethyl phosphite and a halomethane (e.g. iodomethane) via the Michaelis–Arbuzov reaction.

Dimethyl methylphosphonate is a schedule 2 chemical as it may be used in the production of chemical weapons. It will react with thionyl chloride to produce methylphosphonic acid dichloride, which is used in the production of sarin and soman nerve agents. Various amines can be used to catalyse this process.  It can be used as a sarin-simulant for the calibration of organophosphorus detectors.

Uses
The primary commercial use of dimethyl methylphosphonate is as a flame retardant. Other commercial uses are a preignition additive for gasoline, anti-foaming agent, plasticizer, stabilizer, textile conditioner, antistatic agent, and an additive for solvents and low-temperature hydraulic fluids. It can be used as a catalyst and a reagent in organic synthesis, as it can generate a highly reactive ylide.

About 190 liters of dimethyl methylphosphonate, together with other chemicals, were released during the crash of El Al Flight 1862 at Bijlmer in Amsterdam in 1992.

References

Methyl esters
Phosphonate esters
Flame retardants
Plasticizers
Chemical weapons
Antistatic agents
Fuel additives
Nerve agent precursors